The men's 1500 metres at the 2022 World Athletics U20 Championships was held at the Estadio Olímpico Pascual Guerrero in Cali, Colombia on 1 and 3 August 2022.

44 athletes from 31 countries were originally entered to the competition, however, 41 of them competed.

Records
U20 standing records prior to the 2022 World Athletics U20 Championships were as follows:

Results

Round 1
The round 1 took place on 1 August, with the 41 athletes involved being splitted into 2 heats of 14 and 1 of 13 athletes each. The first 3 athletes in each heat ( Q ) and the next 3 fastest ( q ) qualified to the final. The overall results were as follows:

Final
The final was started at 19:55 on 3 August.

References

1500 metres
1500 metres at the World Athletics U20 Championships